The Municipality of North Cypress – Langford is a rural municipality (RM) in the Canadian province of Manitoba.
It is located northeast and east of the City of Brandon.  The Town of Neepawa borders the RM to the north.  Canadian Forces Base Shilo is also adjacent to the RM.

History

The RM was incorporated on January 1, 2015 via the amalgamation of the RMs of Langford and North Cypress. It was formed as a requirement of The Municipal Amalgamations Act, which required that municipalities with a population less than 1,000 amalgamate with one or more neighbouring municipalities by 2015. The Government of Manitoba initiated these amalgamations in order for municipalities to meet the 1997 minimum population requirement of 1,000 to incorporate a municipality.

Communities
 Brookdale
 Edrans
 Wellwood

Demographics 

References 

2015 establishments in Manitoba
Manitoba municipal amalgamations, 2015
Populated places established in 2015
Rural municipalities in Manitoba